Sheshnaag is a 1990 Indian Hindi-language fantasy film, produced by Syed Ayub, Deepak Adhiya and Nalini Shankar under the AA Films banner and directed by K.R. Reddy. It stars Jeetendra, Rishi Kapoor, Rekha, Madhavi, Mandakini  and music composed by Laxmikant–Pyarelal.

Plot
The film begins at a mysterious hidden temple of serpent God Sheshnaag where every lunar eclipse the Lord bestows a treasure under the protection of powerful shapeshifting snakes Pritam Nag & Bhanu Nagin. Here, as a boon, the person who is showered in the moonlight becomes immortal. Aghori the highly venomous wizard is fretful to acquire that supreme power. So, he steps out by creating huge destruction of snakes. Then, Pritam lion-heartedly encounters and defeats Aghori but is unable to wipe them out as he is virulent. Aghori strikes back with his witchcraft in which the snake form of Bhanu is wounded. Bhola a callow villager rescues her when Pritam & Bhanu become indebted to him. After the death of his father, Bhola reaches his sister Champa where he is subjected to several punishments from his roguish brother-in-law Bansi ultimately, necks him out.

Once, Bansi wages Champa in gambling when a few wicked try to molest her and she jumps into a cliff. Knowing it, Bhola attempts suicide, to save Bhanu transfigures as Champa, and bestows him with wealth by which Bhola turns riches. Afterward, they shift to a mansion where Pritam joins as a servant and seeks to sculpt Bhola as courageous. Parallelly, Bhola falls for Kamini daughter of a ruthless Seth Lalchand. He conducts the trafficking of animals with a partner Vikram and also a disciple of Aghori. Once, Bhola spots the closeness of Pritam & Bhanu as Champa, misunderstands, and revolts on Pritam. In tandem, he fetches Bansi which leads Pritam to quit. Meanwhile, Lalchand decides knit Kamini with Vikram and solicits Aghori to wipe out Bhola. So, he bites him and his body is poisoned.

During that plight, Bhanu sucks the poison, and she too goes into danger when Pritam with his omnipotent power protects them. Now Pritam divulges the fact to Bhola, unites him with real Champa, and makes Bhola as a gallant. Besides, the wedding arrangements of Vikram & Kamini are in progress, which Bhola breaks down along with Pritam. However, Aghori succeeds in seizing them all, lands at Sheshnaag temple, and extorts Pritam & Bhanu to accomplish the mission by keeping Bhola at risk. Thus, Aghori triumphs in achieving eternity and wreaks havoc. In that quandary, Lord Shiva proclaims the only way to eliminate him is to strive on his chest. At last, Pritam & Bhola ceases Aghori, Finally, the movie ends on a happy note with Pritam & Bhanu proceeding towards heaven.

Cast
Jeetendra as Pritam (Ichchhadhari Naag - Shape Shifting Male Cobra), Banu's Husband
Madhavi as Banu (Ichchhadhari Naagin - Shape Shifting Female Cobra), Pritam's Wife
Mandakini as Kamini
Rishi Kapoor as Bhola
Rekha as Champa,Madam X (Dancer) Bhola's Pritam Elder Sister
Anupam Kher as Bansi Lal, Champa's Husband
Danny Denzongpa as Aghori, a Snake Charmer
Raza Murad as Seth Lalchand, Kamini's Father
Bharat Bhushan as Bhola & Champa's father
Dan Dhanoa as Vikram
Sudhir as one of Aghori's disciples
Jack Gaud as Ganpat, Bansi Lal's Gambler Friend
Birbal as Batesar, Bansi Lal's Gambler Friend

Soundtrack 
Anand Bakshi write all the songs.

References

1990s Hindi-language films
1990 fantasy films
Indian fantasy films
Films scored by Laxmikant–Pyarelal